Algorismus is a short treatise on mathematics, written in Old Icelandic. It is the oldest text on mathematics in a Scandinavian language and survives in the early fourteenth-century manuscript Hauksbók, a large book written and compiled by Icelanders and taken to Norway during the later part of the 13th century by Haukur Erlendsson. It is probably a translation from Latin into Old Norse of some pages included in more ancient books such as Carmen de Algorismo by De Villa Dei of 1200, Liber Abaci by Fibonacci of 1202, and Algorismus Vulgaris by De Sacrobosco of 1230.

References

Icelandic literature
Icelandic manuscripts
Mathematics manuscripts
Mathematics textbooks
Old Norse literature
14th-century books